Posttaygetis is a monotypic butterfly genus of the subfamily Satyrinae in the family Nymphalidae. Its one species is Posttaygetis penelea, which is found in the Neotropical realm.

References

Euptychiina
Nymphalidae of South America
Monotypic butterfly genera
Taxa named by Walter Forster (entomologist)
Taxa named by Pieter Cramer